Susan Carol Schwab (born March 23, 1955) is an American politician, who served under President George W. Bush as United States Trade Representative from June, 2006 to January, 2009. She is not related to Charles R. Schwab Sr., founder of the Charles Schwab Corporation, despite coincidentally sharing the same last name; she is also not to be confused with his first wife Susan (Cotter) Schwab.

She was nominated to replace Rob Portman as United States Trade Representative in April, 2006, becoming Acting Trade Representative upon Portman's confirmation as director of the Office of Management and Budget. Previously, she served as Deputy United States Trade Representative from 2005 to 2006.

Career
Prior to becoming Deputy Trade Representative, she had served since 2003 as President and CEO of the University System of Maryland Foundation. From 1995 to 2003, she served as Dean of the School of Public Policy at the University of Maryland, College Park, where she remains on the faculty. Earlier in her career, she served as an aide to then-U.S. Senator John Danforth, as a foreign service officer in the State Department, as a well-respected Director-General of the Foreign and Commercial Service within the U.S. Department of Commerce, and as a business development executive at Motorola. Her first job was a trade negotiator with the USTR office, and she later served as Trade Policy Officer in the United States Embassy in Tokyo.

She negotiated the United States-Canada softwood lumber dispute  by  signing a deal along with Canadian Trade Minister David Emerson on September 12, 2006 that gave Canada $4 billion out of the 5.3 billion dollars that the country lost in the dispute.

On January 13, 2009, as the Bush Administration neared its end, Schwab reportedly announced retaliatory tariffs on "dozens" of European luxury items, including French truffles, Irish oatmeal, Italian sparkling water and Roquefort cheese. The European ban on U.S. beef containing hormones was the reason cited by the US for the retaliatory action. Roquefort cheese, made from sheep's milk in a region of southern France, was hit with a 300% tariff, apparently the highest level by far of any in the package. When a 100% tariff was placed on the cheese in 1999, the report says, José Bové helped marshal opposition. As of 2009, the French complaint with the Roquefort tariff is being pursued through diplomatic channels.  She helped to launch negotiations for ACTA.

Board of directors member
On June 8, 2009, the Board of Directors of FedEx Corporation elected Ambassador Schwab as a director. The Board also appointed Ambassador Schwab as a member of its Compensation Committee. She also sits  on the Board of Directors  at Boeing and Caterpillar Inc.

Personal information
Schwab is a resident of Annapolis, Maryland. She attended Williams College (BA) in Political Economy, Stanford University (MA) in Development Policy and George Washington University (Ph.D) in Public Administration and International Business. She is a 1972 graduate of International School Bangkok.

Coincidentally, she happens to share a name with Susan (Cotter) Schwab, the ex-wife of Charles R. Schwab Sr., founder of the Charles Schwab Corporation; however, she is of no relation to Schwab Sr., his family, or his ex-wife at all.

References

External links

1955 births
American women chief executives
Boeing people
Caterpillar Inc. people
American corporate directors
FedEx people
George W. Bush administration cabinet members
21st-century American politicians
Trachtenberg School of Public Policy & Public Administration alumni
Living people
American people of German descent
Maryland Republicans
Politicians from Annapolis, Maryland
Stanford University alumni
United States Trade Representatives
University of Maryland, College Park faculty
Williams College alumni
Women members of the Cabinet of the United States
21st-century American women politicians